The Diocese of Dar es Salaam may refer to;

Anglican Diocese of Dar es Salaam, in the city of Dar es Salaam, Tanzania
Roman Catholic Archdiocese of Dar es Salaam, in the city of Dar es Salaam, Tanzania